The Infantry Assault Badge was a German military decoration awarded to Waffen-SS and Wehrmacht Heer soldiers during the Second World War. This decoration was instituted on 20 December 1939 by the Commander-in-Chief (Oberbefehlshaber) of the German Army, Generalfeldmarschall Walther von Brauchitsch. It could be awarded to members of infantry and Gebirgsjäger (mountain infantry) units that had participated in infantry assaults, with light infantry weapons, on at least three separate days of battle in the front line on or after 1 January 1940. When a counter-offensive led to fighting, it could also apply. Award of the Infantry Assault Badge was authorized at regimental command level, and mechanized or motorized infantry were not eligible for the original badge. A bronze variant of the Infantry Assault Badge was created in June 1940, authorized for motorized and mechanized infantry units, using similar requirements for award as the original silver variant. Non-infantry personnel were not eligible for either grade of the Infantry Assault Badge, but were eligible for other combat recognition badges (depending on their military occupation, branch of service, and assigned unit), usually the General Assault Badge, Close Combat Clasp, or the Panzer Badge. The Luftwaffe would develop its own ground combat badge in 1942, the Ground Assault Badge.

Classes

Silver 
The silver class was instituted on 20 December 1939 by the commander of the OKH, Walther von Brauchitsch, and was awarded to infantry soldiers according to one of the following criteria:

 To have taken part in at least three: infantry assaults (including counter-attacks) or at least three armed reconnaissance operations or engaged in hand-to-hand combat in an assault position or participated on three separate days in the reestablishment of combat positions.

Bronze 
The bronze class was instituted on 1 June 1940. It was awarded to motorized/Mechanized Infantry troops according to the same criteria as listed above.

Design
The badge was designed by the company C. E. Junker of Berlin. It is oval in shape, with four oak leaves on each side; on the top is a national eagle clutching a swastika and a rifle with a fixed bayonet across the badge. The reverse of the badge is plain and has a pin attached to it. The original "silver" badges were made of silver-plate and the later ones were made of zinc. The "bronze" version was actually made of a "metal alloy".

1957 version
On 26 July, 1957, the West German federal government passed the "Law of Titles, Orders and Honours", which permitted World War II veterans serving in the Bundeswehr to wear certain earned decorations from the conflict, as long as they were denazified. The Infantry Assault Badge was among the permitted decorations; The re-authorized version had the Reichsadler and swastika removed. Denazified versions of both the silver & bronze grades were authorized and produced.

Notes

References 

Awards established in 1939
Military awards and decorations of Nazi Germany
1939 establishments in Germany